Matthias Kleinheisterkamp (22 June 1893 – 29 April 1945) was an SS-Obergruppenführer during World War II. He commanded the  SS Division Totenkopf, SS Division Nord, SS Division Das Reich, III SS Panzer Corps, VII SS Panzer Corps, IV SS Panzer Corps, XII SS Army Corps and the XI SS Army Corps. He killed himself after being captured by the Soviets.

Pre-war career
Born in 1893, Matthias Kleinheisterkamp enlisted in the Prussian Army in 1914 and served on both the Western and the Eastern Fronts of World War I. During his service in the war, he was awarded both classes of the Iron Cross and a silver grade Wound Badge. Following the war, Kleinheisterkamp joined the paramilitary group Freikorps and then served in the Reichswehr. He joined the Allgemeine-SS in November 1933, membership number 132,399. He transferred to the SS-Verfügungstruppe on 1 April 1935 and was assigned to the SS training school as an infantry instructor. In 1934, he joined the Inspectorate of the SS-VT as a senior staff officer, serving under Paul Hausser.

On 20 April 1937, Kleinheisterkamp joined the NSDAP, membership number 4,158,838. His career stalled when in June 1938 he experienced serious legal and disciplinary troubles. He was reprimanded by the SS Court Main Office and placed on leave until August 1938. Upon his return to active duty, he was assigned to the SS-Standarte Deutschland, which later became the SS Division Das Reich.

World War II
With this unit, Kleinheisterkamp took part in the Invasion of Poland, where he commanded the Group Kleinheisterkamp responsible in part for the evacuation of German citizens and diplomatic personnel from Warsaw. In May 1940, he was put in charge of an infantry regiment within the SS Division Totenkopf under the overall command of Theodor Eicke. After Eicke was injured in July 1941, Kleinheisterkamp was, for a short time, commander of the Totenkopf, before being replaced by Georg Keppler. He was then transferred first to SS-Führungshauptamt (SS Leadership Main Office) and later to the SS Division Das Reich.

For his leadership of Das Reich during the operations on Eastern Front, Kleinheisterkamp was awarded the Knight's Cross of the Iron Cross. In June 1942, he took over command of the SS Division Nord, leading the unit until December 1943, when he was transferred to the Waffen-SS reserves. In January 1944, he was assigned to command the VII SS Panzer Corps, III SS Panzer Corps, IV SS Panzer Corps and the XI SS Army Corps.

Arrest and suicide
Kleinheisterkamp was taken prisoner by the Soviet forces on 28 April 1945 near the village of Halbe, south-east of Berlin. He committed suicide a day later while in captivity. Other accounts state he died on 2 May in the Battle of Halbe. Posthumously, Kleinheisterkamp was awarded Oak Leaves to his Knight's Cross.

Summary of SS career

Dates of rank
 SS-Hauptsturmführer: 20 April 1935
 SS-Sturmbannführer: 1 June 1935
 SS-Obersturmbannführer: 20 April 1937
 SS-Standartenführer: 18 May 1940
 SS-Oberführer: 19 July 1940
 SS-Brigadeführer und Generalmajor der Waffen-SS: 9 November 1941
 SS-Gruppenführer und Generaleutnant der Waffen-SS: 1 May 1943
 SS-Obergruppenführer und General der Waffen-SS: 1 August 1944

Awards
 Clasp to the Iron Cross (1939)
 2nd Class (13 September 1939)
 1st Class (2 October 1939)
 Knight's Cross of the Iron Cross on 31 March 1942 as SS-Brigadeführer, Generalmajor of the Waffen-SS and commander of the SS-Division "Das Reich"
 871st Oak Leaves on 9 May 1945 (posthumously) as SS-Obergruppenführer, Generalleutnant of the Waffen-SS and commanding general of the XI. SS-Panzerkorps
 Order of the Cross of Liberty 1st Class with swords

See also
List SS-Obergruppenführer

Notes

References

Sources

 
 
 

1893 births
1945 suicides
Military personnel from Wuppertal
People from the Rhine Province
German Army personnel of World War I
SS-Obergruppenführer
Recipients of the Order of the Cross of Liberty, 1st Class
Recipients of the Knight's Cross of the Iron Cross with Oak Leaves
Recipients of the clasp to the Iron Cross, 1st class
Nazis who committed suicide in prison custody
Nazi Party officials
German people who died in Soviet detention
Prussian Army personnel
Waffen-SS personnel
20th-century Freikorps personnel